Earl B. Olson (May 8, 1915 – December 11, 2006) was a businessman who founded the Jennie-O Turkey company (now part of Hormel).

Early life and family
Earl B. Olson was born on a farm north of Murdock, Minnesota, the son of Olof and Anna (Anderson) Olson. Both his father and mother were immigrants from  Sweden. After eight grades of school in Murdock, Olson  enrolled in the West Central School of Agriculture, Morris, MN, (now the University of Minnesota Morris) graduating in 1932.

Business activities
Olson first ran a small creamery in Swift Falls, Minnesota, which processed turkeys on the side.  In 1940, Earl Olson   began raising turkeys. In 1949 he bought the former Farmers Produce Company of Willmar and its turkey processing plant. By 1953, Mr. Olson converted Farmer's Produce to a USDA-inspected eviscerated turkey plant and developed the brand name Jennie-O—after Earl and Dorothy Olson's daughter, Jennifer, and the 'O' in Olson. He served as president and chief executive officer until 1974, when he became chairman of the board. He was chairman emeritus at the time of his death.

He was a mainstay of the turkey industry, and a pioneer in developing new turkey products and expanding the marketplace.

References

External links
Obituary in Minneapolis StarTribune

People from Willmar, Minnesota
1915 births
2006 deaths
American people of Swedish descent
20th-century American businesspeople
People from Swift County, Minnesota
University of Minnesota Morris alumni